Events from the year 1902 in Canada.

Incumbents

Crown 
 Monarch – Edward VII

Federal government 
 Governor General – Gilbert Elliot-Murray-Kynynmound, 4th Earl of Minto 
 Prime Minister – Wilfrid Laurier
 Chief Justice – Samuel Henry Strong (Ontario) (until 18 November) then Henri Elzéar Taschereau (Quebec)
 Parliament – 9th

Provincial governments

Lieutenant governors 
Lieutenant Governor of British Columbia – Henri-Gustave Joly de Lotbinière
Lieutenant Governor of Manitoba – Daniel Hunter McMillan
Lieutenant Governor of New Brunswick – Abner Reid McClelan (until January 28) then Jabez Bunting Snowball 
Lieutenant Governor of Nova Scotia – Alfred Gilpin Jones    
Lieutenant Governor of Ontario – Oliver Mowat 
Lieutenant Governor of Prince Edward Island – Peter Adolphus McIntyre  
Lieutenant Governor of Quebec – Louis-Amable Jetté

Premiers 
Premier of British Columbia –  James Dunsmuir (until November 21) then Edward Prior 
Premier of Manitoba – Rodmond Roblin  
Premier of New Brunswick – Lemuel John Tweedie
Premier of Nova Scotia – George Henry Murray 
Premier of Ontario – George William Ross    
Premier of Prince Edward Island – Arthur Peters 
Premier of Quebec – Simon-Napoléon Parent

Territorial governments

Commissioners 
 Commissioner of Yukon – James Hamilton Ross (until February 8) then Henry W. Newlands (acting) (February 8 to August 15) then Zachary Taylor Wood (acting)

Lieutenant governors 
 Lieutenant Governor of Keewatin – Daniel Hunter McMillan
 Lieutenant Governor of the North-West Territories – Amédée E. Forget

Premiers 
 Premier of the North-West Territories – Frederick Haultain

Events
February – The town of Crofton, British Columbia, is founded on Vancouver Island
May 21 – 1902 Northwest Territories general election
May 24 – The first Victoria Day is celebrated
May 29 – 1902 Ontario general election: G. W. Ross's Liberals win a second consecutive majority. Margaret Haile runs as a candidate of the Canadian Socialist League in Toronto North, becoming the first woman ever to stand in a provincial election.
May 31 – The Second Boer War ends, and Canadian troops return home to great acclaim
July 1 – Ray Knight stages the first Raymond Stampede in Raymond, Alberta. This was the first use of the word stampede in the name of a rodeo. The Raymond Stampede is now Canada's oldest rodeo
August 9 – Edward VII is crowned King of the United Kingdom and of Canada. 
October 10 – Altona schoolhouse shooting
October 20 – The first train enters Edmonton, by way of the Canadian Northern's Edmonton, Yukon and Pacific Railway across the Low Level Bridge
November 21 – Edward Prior becomes Premier of British Columbia, replacing James Dunsmuir
December 15 – The first transatlantic radio press report is filed from Glace Bay, Nova Scotia.
The first ascent of Mount Forbes by James Outram and party

Arts and literature
The first symphony orchestra in Canada begins in Quebec City.
The first movie theatre in Canada opens in Vancouver

Births

January to June
January 22 – Jean-Paul Beaulieu, politician and chartered accountant (d.1976)
February 17 – Howard O'Hagan, writer
April 14 – Olive Diefenbaker, wife of John Diefenbaker, 13th Prime Minister of Canada (d.1976)
April 20 – Elizabeth Goudie, writer (d.1982)
May 24 – Sylvia Daoust, sculptor (d.2004)
June 17 – Anna Hilliard, doctor
June 19 – Guy Lombardo, bandleader and violinist (d.1977)
June 21 – Howie Morenz, ice hockey player (d.1937)

July to December
July 15 – Donald Creighton, historian (d.1979)
July 30 – Dorise Nielson, politician (d.1980)
August 10 – Norma Shearer, Academy Award-winning actress (d.1983)
November 8 – A. J. M. Smith, poet (d.1980)
November 21 – Foster Hewitt, radio pioneer (d.1985)
December 29 – Nels Stewart, ice hockey player (d.1957)

Deaths
February 12 – Frederick Hamilton-Temple-Blackwood, 1st Marquess of Dufferin and Ava, Governor General of Canada (b.1826)
February 19 – Richard Maurice Bucke, psychiatrist (b.1837)
August 5 – Thomas Christie, physician, professor and politician (b.1834)
August 10 – James McMillan, United States Senator from Michigan from 1889 until 1902. (b.1838)
October 31 – John A. Dawson, politician (b.1826)

Historical documents
Laurier cabinet member praised as "Finance Minister of surpluses, high wages and general prosperity"

North-West Territories official says rapidly developing N.W.T. could become Canada's dominant province

Copper and nickel miners live in pollution-devastated landscape near Sudbury, Ontario

Western farmers form grain growers association to oppose corporations and "wheat blockade"

Immigrants arrive in Saskatchewan and enjoy megabushel first harvest of wheat

Entomologist on pest control with crude petroleum, potash-and-fish-oil (either in solution) and hydrocyanic acid gas in fumigation tents

Young mission doctor captains medical ship through storm on Strait of Belle Isle

Lucy Maud Montgomery gives tips to beginning photographers

References 

 
Years of the 20th century in Canada
Canada
Canada